Dior Alexandros Lowhorn (born April 15, 1987) is an American professional basketball player. He now plays for Abejas de León of the LNBP. He played college basketball for Texas Tech and San Francisco.

High school career
Lowhorn attended International Studies Academy in San Francisco his freshman year of high school, where he was a standout in basketball. At ISA, Lowhorn averaged 15 pts, 8 rbs and was named Second Team All AAA. His sophomore year he attended Archbishop Riordan High School in San Francisco, where he was named First Team All WCAL and First Team All State. On December 16, 2002, Lowhorn led his Riordan team to the Burlingame Tournament Championship, breaking the school's single-game scoring record with 48 points. In 2003 Lowhorn transferred to Berkeley High School, where he was honored both his junior and senior year with numerous accolades including ACCAL Player of the Year, NorCal Player of the Year and First Team All State. His senior year Berkeley captured their first NCS Title since 1978.

College career
Lowhorn attended Texas Tech University, where he averaged 7.6 ppg and 3.2 rpg while playing for coach Bob Knight.

In 2006, Lowhorn transferred to the University of San Francisco, where he red-shirted his first year due to NCAA rules.

In 2007, Lowhorn averaged 20.5 ppg and 7.2 rpg. He was named First Team All WCC. He ended his sophomore year with a total of 636 points, the fourth-most points a USF Don has ever scored in a single season. Due to a coaching change, he finished that season under coach Eddie Sutton.

In 2008, Lowhorn averaged 20.1 ppg and 6.9 rpg. He was named First Team All WCC. After the 2008–2009 season, Lowhorn was invited for a pre-draft workout with the Portland Trail Blazers and Sacramento Kings. In 2009, Lowhorn averaged 18.9 ppg and 6.2 rpg. He was yet again named First Team All WCC. Due to another university coaching change, Lowhorn played under former NBA player Rex Walters. During Lowhorn's senior year he broke the fastest to 1,000 points record previously held by USF Hall of Famer and ten-time NBA champion Bill Russell. After the 2009–2010 season, Lowhorn was invited to pre-draft workouts with the Portland Trail Blazers, Sacramento Kings and Golden State Warriors.

Professional career
Between 2010 and 2015, Lowhorn played in Europe, Morocco, Southeast Asia and South America.

On November 2, 2015, Lowhorn was acquired by the Santa Cruz Warriors of the NBA Development League. However, he was waived on November 10, before playing a game for the Warriors.

Lowhorn spent the 2019-20 season with Pelita Jaya Bakrie of the Indonesian Basketball League (IBL). He averaged 28.3 points, 13.6 rebounds, 1.3 assists, and 1.2 blocks per game. On August 25, 2020, Lowhorn signed with Plateros de Fresnillo of the LNBP. He averaged 6.6 points, 4.0 rebounds, and 1.0 assist per game. On October 9, 2021, Lowhorn signed with Abejas de León.

Personal life
Lowhorn has one son, Dior Alejandro Lowhorn, born September 17, 2015. Lowhorn's parents are April Chandler and Walter Lowhorn. He has one brother, Paris Lowhorn. Lowhorn graduated from the University of San Francisco with an Environmental Studies major. Played AAU basketball with Bay Area Blast, Oakland Soldiers, Next Level, Frisco Finest, Oakland Rebels, Mission Rec, SF Boys club, Hamilton Park, H-Squad, and Belmont Shores. Starred in Baseball as a kid before growing and playing basketball.

References

External links
 DraftExpress profile
 ESPN profile

1987 births
Living people
American expatriate basketball people in Argentina
American expatriate basketball people in Belgium
American expatriate basketball people in the Czech Republic
American expatriate basketball people in Indonesia
American expatriate basketball people in Japan
American expatriate basketball people in Mexico
American expatriate basketball people in Morocco
American expatriate basketball people in the Philippines
American expatriate basketball people in Ukraine
American expatriate basketball people in Venezuela
American expatriate basketball people in Vietnam
American expatriate sportspeople in Singapore
American men's basketball players
Abejas de León players
ASEAN Basketball League players
Barangay Ginebra San Miguel players
Basketball players from San Francisco
BC Dnipro-Azot players
Berkeley High School (Berkeley, California) alumni
Gaiteros del Zulia players
La Unión basketball players
Leuven Bears players
NorthPort Batang Pier players
Philippine Basketball Association imports
Power forwards (basketball)
Rain or Shine Elasto Painters players
Saigon Heat players
San Francisco Dons men's basketball players
San-en NeoPhoenix players
Singapore Slingers players
Small forwards
Texas Tech Red Raiders basketball players